Mr. Reeder in Room 13 is a 1938 British crime film directed by Norman Lee and starring Peter Murray-Hill, Sally Gray and Gibb McLaughlin. It is based on the first J. G. Reeder book, Room 13 by Edgar Wallace. The film was released in the U.S. in 1941 as Mystery of Room 13.

Plot summary
Mr. J.G. Reeder (Gibb McLaughlin) is called in by the Bank of England to investigate a gang of forgers. Reeder enlists the aid of a younger man, Capt. Johnnie Gray (Peter Murray Hill), to infiltrate the gang by going undercover in Dartmoor jail.

Cast
 Peter Murray-Hill as Captain Johnnie Gray 
 Sally Gray as Claire Kane
 Gibb McLaughlin as J.G. Reeder 
 Malcolm Keen as Peter Kane 
 Leslie Perrins as Jeffrey Legge
 Sara Seegar as Lila Legge 
 D.J. Williams as Emmanuel Legge 
 Rex Carvel as Sir John Flaherty 
 Robert Cochran as Detective Inspector Barker 
 Phil Ray as Fenner, convict

Critical reception
Britmovie wrote, "director Norman Lee keeps things moving along briskly and packs plenty of goings-on into its relatively short running time, but the outlandish plot requires some suspension of disbelief."

See also
 Room 13 (1964)
 The Mind of Mr. J.G. Reeder (1969–71)

References

External links

1938 films
1938 crime films
1930s English-language films
Films directed by Norman Lee
Films based on short fiction
Films based on works by Edgar Wallace
Films set in London
Films set in Devon
British black-and-white films
British crime films
1930s British films